In North Carolina, the Crystal Coast is an 85-mile stretch of coastline that extends from the Cape Lookout National Seashore, which includes 56 miles of protected beaches, southwestward to the New River. The Crystal Coast is a popular area with tourists and second-home owners in the summer.

The absolute boundaries of this coast are often disputed, but the main area includes all the major Carteret County beaches (those on Bogue Banks, which face south). It also includes eastern portions of Carteret County, such as Harkers Island, Down East and Shackleford Banks, as well as the northern Onslow County beaches (Bear Island/Hammock's Beach), and a few ports along the Intracoastal Waterway.  Some tourism marketing describes the region as the Southern Outer Banks, to draw a connection to the main barrier islands of the Outer Banks.

The main communities include the coastal resorts of Atlantic Beach, Emerald Isle, Indian Beach, Pine Knoll Shores and Salter Path, as well as the inland (sound-side) ports of Beaufort, Morehead City, and Swansboro.  Besides the many quiet beach communities and numerous shops and restaurants in the area, other major attractions include Fort Macon State Park, which protects a series of historic coastal forts used from the early 19th to the mid 20th century, and the North Carolina Aquarium at Pine Knoll Shores, one of three such aquariums located along the North Carolina coast.  A population of feral Banker horses is located on Shackleford Banks, and several protected areas, including Hammocks Beach State Park, Cape Lookout National Seashore (including the ghost town of Portsmouth) lie along the region as well.

Tourism

Beaches 
The Carteret County Tourism Development Authority coined the name of Crystal Coast, to highlight the appeal of its waters. This body is also known as the Crystal Coast Tourism Authority.

The area has more than 100 restaurants and many hotels, including the Doubletree Atlantic Beach, the largest full-service hotel on the coast of North Carolina. Beach cottages, which are often rented out for a week during the summer, are also popular here, especially in Emerald Isle. Numerous properties are held as second homes by people with full-time residences in the interior of the state, such as in the cities of Kinston, Goldsboro and the capital Raleigh.

Many areas in this region have public access to the beaches, with one of the most popular being an area known as "The Circle" in central Atlantic Beach. It is a collection of shops, houses and amusement rides along the ocean at the end of the causeway from the bridge to Morehead City. Redevelopment is replacing the central area of rides with high-rise apartments, new restaurants, and shops.

Diving and fishing 

Diving and fishing also attract visitors to the Crystal Coast. This is one of the two spots in North America where the warm waters of the Gulf Stream approach the coastline, creating a "wreck diver's dream" with near-perfect conditions, according to Scuba Diving magazine. The North Carolina coast is known as the "Graveyard of the Atlantic;" more than 2,000 vessels are recorded as having sunk along here.

During World War II, German U-boats frequently targeted and sank merchant vessels in this area. The clear warm waters enable divers to view them 100 feet beneath the sea. In the 21st century, the Lionfish, a poisonous non-native invasive species with sharp spiny fins and brick red bands covering its body, has been found in these waters, alarming conservationists. Lionfish were previously thought to inhabit only the tropical and subtropical waters of the South Pacific, Indian Ocean and the Red Sea. Diving activities include underwater photography clinics as well as shark and spear fishing dives.

The proximity of the Gulf Stream makes the Crystal Coast a popular fishing destination. The warm waters provide this area with the longest fishing season on the Atlantic coast. One of the largest fishing tournaments in the world, the Big Rock Blue Marlin Tournament, is run from Morehead City. Other fish caught along the Crystal Coast include bluefin tuna, yellowfin tuna, red drum, false albacore, sea trout, striped bass, cobia, sailfish, dolphin and wahoo. Several private charters operate  fishing excursions. Headboat fishing trips can take up to 100 people, making them more affordable for more families.

Morehead City and Atlantic Beach 

The North Carolina Seafood Festival has been held for over 30 years and is one of the largest festivals in the state. It is held near the port of Morehead City; the other state port is Wilmington.

In Atlantic Beach, Fort Macon is a major draw for its Civil War history; it is the  second most-visited state park in North Carolina. During the war, the fort changed hands several times between Union and Confederate forces. Afterward it fell into disrepair but was restored in 1934 as a part of the state park system, during a period of public investment in infrastructure and parks. During World War II, the federal government took over the fort, using it to protect a number of important nearby facilities.

Returned to the state, the park preserves a protected beach. One of three North Carolina aquariums is at Pine Knoll Shores, with the other two in Manteo and Fort Fisher. All three have been recently renovated and enlarged. The “Living Shipwreck” features a life-sized replica of a German U-352 submarine and Blackbeard’s infamous ship, the Queen Anne's Revenge, which was found nearby off the coast a decade ago.

Beaufort and Harkers Island 

Historic Beaufort and Down East Carteret County are known for their history and culture. Beaufort (pronounced "Bo-furt") is the third-oldest Anglo-European town in North Carolina, after Bath and New Bern. It is the site of the North Carolina Maritime Museum, the official repository for all the artifacts discovered on the Queen Anne’s Revenge.  Displays include seashells from around the world, with 5,000 specimens from more than 100 countries. At the museum's Watercraft Center, volunteers build and restore boats in an effort to preserve the Crystal Coast's tradition of "backyard boat-building."

On nearby Harkers Island, the Core Sound Waterfowl Museum displays and helps preserve the island residents' practice of decoy carving. Skilled artisans carve a perfect replica of different varieties of ducks from a block of wood. Residents used the wooden ducks as decoys during duck hunting season. Trips to visit the black-and-white diamond pattern lighthouse at Cape Lookout can also be made from Beaufort and Harker's Island. Nearby Shackleford Banks is home to herds of feral horses, known as Bankers.

Neighbors 
The Core Sound shoreline communities east of Beaufort are known as the "Down East" area of North Carolina. As they are in Carteret County, they are technically part of the Crystal Coast. The beaches and islands north of here, starting with Portsmouth Island and Ocracoke, are known as the Outer Banks.

South of the Crystal Coast is an undeveloped stretch of coast around the mouth of the New River that is part of the Camp Lejeune military base near Jacksonville. The next developed area to the south is Topsail Island in Onslow County.

Places 

The following are the communities, islands, military bases, and parks most commonly associated with the Crystal Coast:
 Atlantic
 Atlantic Beach
 Beaufort
 Bogue
 Broad Creek, North Carolina
 Cape Carteret
 Cape Lookout National Seashore
 Cedar Point
 Emerald Isle
 Fort Macon
 Harkers Island
 Indian Beach
 Morehead City
 Newport
 Peletier
 Pine Knoll Shores
 Salter Path
 Sealevel
 Shackleford Banks

Transportation 
The following highways are major arterial roads in the Crystal Coast area:
 U.S. Highway 70
 North Carolina Highway 58
 North Carolina Highway 24
 North Carolina Highway 101

See also 
 Inner Banks
 Intracoastal Waterway
 Outer Banks

External links 

 Crystal Coast Civic Center - Maps
 Crystal Coast Vacation Planning
 History and Events

Landforms of Carteret County, North Carolina
Beaches of North Carolina
Regions of North Carolina